Thomas Johnson (5 March 1926 – 9 December 2018), known as Tom or Tommy Johnson, was an English footballer who played as a left half or inside forward in the Football League for Darlington and Bradford Park Avenue. He later worked as a physiotherapist for Hartlepool United and Middlesbrough.

Life and career
Johnson was born in Stockton-on-Tees. He played football for Seaton Holy Trinity before signing professional forms with Middlesbrough in early 1945. He played for their first team in wartime football, but made no appearances in the Football League once that competition resumed, and joined Darlington in August 1947. He made his senior debut in the opening match of the 1947–48 Third Division North season, a 4–2 defeat away to Carlisle United, and appeared in four of the next five fixtures, scoring in a 1–1 draw at home to Gateshead on 1 September. He made one more league appearance later in the season, and then moved into non-league football with Stockton and Horden Colliery Welfare. Johnson signed for Bradford Park Avenue in August 1952. Apart from one league appearance, away to Barrow in September, he played reserve-team football before moving back into non-league with Annfield Plain and a further spell with Horden CW.

After his retirement at the age of 30 due to a head injury, Johnson retrained as a physiotherapist. He went on to work for Hartlepool United for 25 years, before moving to Middlesbrough in 1986.

References

1926 births
2018 deaths
Footballers from Stockton-on-Tees
Footballers from County Durham
English footballers
Association football inside forwards
Association football wing halves
Middlesbrough F.C. players
Darlington F.C. players
Stockton F.C. players
Darlington Town F.C. players
Bradford (Park Avenue) A.F.C. players
Annfield Plain F.C. players
English Football League players
Hartlepool United F.C. non-playing staff
Middlesbrough F.C. non-playing staff